Reece Walsh (born 10 July 2002) is an Australian professional rugby league footballer who plays as a  for the Brisbane Broncos in the NRL.

He previously played for the New Zealand Warriors in the National Rugby League.

Background
Walsh was born in Southport, a suburb of the Gold Coast, Queensland, to an Indigenous Australian father, and a Māori mother from Hastings, New Zealand. He was raised by his father and stepmother in the Gold Coast suburb of Nerang, and grew up playing junior rugby league for the Nerang Roosters.

He attended Keebra Park State High School throughout his teenage years before being signed by the Brisbane Broncos.

Playing career

Early career
In 2018, Walsh represented the Queensland Murri under-16 and Queensland under-16 sides. In 2019, he played for the Tweed Heads Seagulls in their National Under-18 Title and Mal Meninga Cup-winning sides while he also spent the year training with the Brisbane Broncos NRL squad. In June 2019, he represented Queensland under-18, scoring a try in their 34–12 win over New South Wales. In September 2019, he represented the Australian Schoolboys, scoring a try in their 36–20 win over the Junior Kiwis.

2021
In 2021, Walsh joined the Brisbane Broncos NRL squad on a development contract. He began the season playing for the Norths Devils in the Queensland Cup.

On 18 March, Walsh signed a three-year contract with the New Zealand Warriors, beginning in 2022. On 10 April, he was released early from his Brisbane contract to join the Warriors immediately.

On 25 April, in round 7 of the 2021 NRL season, Walsh made his first grade debut for the Warriors against Melbourne.

It was confirmed on 21 June that he had been selected to play as fullback for the Queensland Maroons for the second game of the State of Origin series. At 18, he would have been the youngest player to be selected in the Queensland team since Ben Ikin in 1995, however he was ruled out due to an injury.

In round 23, Walsh had a disappointing afternoon with the goal kicking duties only managing to convert one goal from five attempts, including a conversion attempt near the touch-line late in the game which would likely have sent the game against Brisbane into extra-time.  New Zealand lost the match 24-22 which effectively ended their already slim chance of reaching the finals.

Cocaine possession
On 25 September 2021, a video emerged of Walsh being arrested by police at a Surfers Paradise nightclub.  The following day, Walsh fronted the media and said that he had failed a previous move on order by the police.  He then went on to say “I didn’t move on. That led to me getting arrested and taken back to the police station. Once I got back to the police station I got searched and I was in possession of a small bag of cocaine – which I had some during the night.

"No-one else is involved in this. It is solely on me. I put my hand up – I should never have done it. It is a mistake I made. I want to say sorry to sponsors, fans, the Warriors". He was handed a $5000 fine and suspended for two matches over the incident.

2022
On 20 June, Walsh was selected in the extended Queensland Maroons squad for State of Origin Game 2, however did not play.
On 6 July, Walsh was granted an early release from his New Zealand contract to re-join his former club Brisbane starting in 2023.  Walsh cited a relationship breakdown as the reason for the move.  He had also reportedly turned down a $2.8 million offer from new NRL franchise The Dolphins in favour of signing with Brisbane.
On 7 July, Brisbane officially announced his return to the club, on a three-year deal.

2023
On 1 January, it was reported that Walsh became involved in a verbal altercation with Gold Coast player David Fifita. The pair needed to be separated by security staff at Burleigh Heads. In the pre-season trials, Walsh suffered a facial injury in Brisbane's match against the Gold Coast and was ruled out for an indefinite period.
In round 2 of the 2023 NRL season, Walsh made his club debut for Brisbane and scored a try in their 28-16 victory over arch-rivals North Queensland.
The following week, he scored two tries in a 40-18 victory over St. George Illawarra.

References

External links
New Zealand Warriors profile

2002 births
Living people
Sportspeople from the Gold Coast, Queensland
Rugby league players from Gold Coast, Queensland
Australian rugby league players
Australian people of New Zealand descent
Australian people of Māori descent
Indigenous Australian rugby league players
New Zealand Warriors players
Brisbane Broncos players
New Zealand Māori rugby league players
Norths Devils players
Redcliffe Dolphins players
Rugby league fullbacks